Arthur Dreifuss (sometimes credited as Dreyfuss; March 25, 1908 – December 31, 1993) was a German-born American film director, and occasional producer, screenwriter and choreographer.

Dreifuss was active from 1939 through 1968, directing about 50 films and producing a few Columbia Pictures short subjects. Toward the end of his career, Dreifuss concentrated on youth culture films and exploitation movies.

Selected filmography
 Double Deal (1939)
Mystery in Swing (1940)
 Sunday Sinners (1940)
 Reg'lar Fellers (1941)
 Murder on Lenox Avenue (1941)
 The Boss of Big Town (1942)
 Baby Face Morgan (1942)
 The Payoff (1942)
 Campus Rhythm (1943)
 The Sultan's Daughter (1943)
 Melody Parade (1943)
 Ever Since Venus (1944)
 Eadie Was a Lady (1945)
 The Gay Senorita (1945)
 Junior Prom (1946, first of the "Teen Agers" series)
 Shamrock Hill  (1949) 
 The Last Blitzkrieg (1959)
 The Love-Ins (1967)
 Riot on Sunset Strip (1967)
 The Young Runaways (1968)
 For Singles Only (1968)

References

Further reading
 Shaw, Nancy. "Happenings: Black Tie Elegance". Rochester Democrat and Chronicle. 17 October 1970. pp. C1, 4C.
 Vallance, Tom. "Obituary: Arthur Dreifuss". The Independent. 18 September 2011.

External links 
 

1908 births
1993 deaths
American film directors
German emigrants to the United States